Grand Étang (large pond in English) is the largest lake on the island of Réunion, a French territory in the western Indian Ocean. 
It lies in the commune of Saint-Benoît, close to La Plaine-des-Palmistes, in the eastern part of the island. Its inflow is a short creek from the waterfall Cascade Biberon of the Bras d'Annette creek. It was created by a lava flow acting as a natural dam afterwards. It does not have an outflow.

See also
 Rivière des Marsouins – Grand Étang Important Bird Area

References

External links
Photo of Grand Étang

Lakes of Réunion
Réunion National Park